Eleutherodactylus nubicola is a species of frog in the family Eleutherodactylidae endemic to Jamaica. Its natural habitat is subtropical or tropical moist montane forest.
It is threatened by habitat loss.

References

nubicola
Endemic fauna of Jamaica
Amphibians of Jamaica
Amphibians described in 1926
Taxonomy articles created by Polbot